New Hampshire in the American Civil War was the story of a small state remote from the battlefield that contributed strongly in terms of soldiers, money and supplies. It sent 31,650 enlisted men and 836 officers, of whom about 20% were killed in action or died from disease or accident.

Soldiers: 1861–1865

As news arrived of the formation of a Confederate nations, by January 1861, top officials were secretly meeting with Governor John A. Andrew of Massachusetts to coordinate plans in case the war came. Plans were made to rush militia units to Washington in an emergency.

New Hampshire fielded 31,650 enlisted men and 836 officers. The state provided eighteen volunteer infantry regiments (thirteen of which were raised in 1861 in response to Lincoln's call to arms), three rifle regiments (who served in the 1st United States Sharpshooters and 2nd United States Sharpshooters), one cavalry battalion (the 1st New Hampshire Volunteer Cavalry, which was attached to the 1st New England Volunteer Cavalry), and two artillery units (the 1st New Hampshire Light Battery and 1st New Hampshire Heavy Artillery), as well as 3000 men for the Navy and Marine Corps.

Among the most celebrated of New Hampshire's units was the 5th New Hampshire Volunteer Infantry, commanded by Colonel Edward Ephraim Cross. Called the "Fighting Fifth" in newspaper accounts, the regiment was considered among the Union's best both during the war (Major General Winfield Scott called the regiment "refined gold" in 1863) and by historians afterward. The Civil War veteran and early Civil War historian William F. Fox determined that this regiment had the highest number of battle-related deaths of any Union regiment. The 20th-century historian Bruce Catton said that the Fifth New Hampshire was "one of the best combat units in the army" and that Cross was "an uncommonly talented regimental commander."

The critical post of state Adjutant General was held in 1861-64 by elderly politician Anthony C. Colby (1792-1873) and his son Daniel E. Colby (1816-1891). They were patriotic, but were overwhelmed with the complexity of their duties. The state had no track of men who enlisted after 1861; no personnel records or information on volunteers, substitutes, or draftees. There was no inventory of weaponry and supplies. Nathaniel Head (1828-1883) took over in 1864, obtained an adequate budget and office staff, and reconstructed the missing paperwork. As a result, widows, orphans, and disabled veterans received the postwar payments they had earned.

Politics

In March 1861 Nathaniel S. Berry  was first Republican governor. He was reelected in March 1862, and served from June 1861 to June 1863.

Serving during the American Civil War, Berry was a strong supporter of the Union. During his governorship New Hampshire provided to the Union Army fifteen infantry regiments, three companies of sharpshooters, four companies of cavalry and one company of heavy artillery.

In June 1862, Abraham Lincoln desired to issue a call for more recruits to join the Union Army, but hesitated because he wanted to demonstrate that the war effort still had popular support, following a perceived ebb in Union state morale as the result of several battlefield reverses. Berry was one of the organizers of an effort to send Lincoln a letter from the state governors to inform him that the states would respond positively if he issued a call for additional troops. Now able to demonstrate popular support for continuing the war effort, Lincoln requested the states to provide additional soldiers.

Berry was also an active participant in the September 1862 War Governors' Conference. During this meeting Union state governors indicated their continued support for Lincoln's wartime policies, including the Emancipation Proclamation Lincoln indicated he intended to issue at an opportune moment.

See also
 Union (American Civil War)

References

Further reading

 Child, William. A History of the Fifth Regiment New Hampshire Volunteers in the American Civil War (1893)
 Cleveland, Dr. Mather. New Hampshire and the Civil War (Regiments in the 9th Army Corps 1861-1865) (1953), especially strong on medicine and casualties.

 Heald, Bruce D. New Hampshire in the Civil War (Arcadia Publishing, 2001); heavily illustrated. online.

 Kemp, Thomas R. "Community and war: The Civil War experience of two New Hampshire towns." in Toward a Social History of the American Civil War: Exploratory Essays ed by Maris Vinovskis (1990): 31-77.
Marvel, William. "New Hampshire and the Draft, 1863." Historical New Hampshire 36 (1981): 58-72.
 Marvel, William. "A Poor Man’s Fight: Civil War Enlistment Patterns in Conway, New Hampshire." Historical New Hampshire 43 (1988): 21-40.

 Renda, Lex. Running on the Record: Civil War-Era Politics in New Hampshire (U of Virginia Press, 1997). online review
 Scott, Kenneth. "Press opposition to Lincoln in New Hampshire," New England Quarterly 21 (1948) pp 326-41. 
 Stackpole, Everett S. History of New Hampshire (4 vol 1916-1922) vol 4 online covers Civil War and late 19th century

 Stanyan, John M. A history of the Eighth Regiment of New Hampshire Volunteers, including its service as infantry, Second N. H. Cavalry, and Veteran Battalion in the Civil War of 1861-1865 (1892) online

 Waite, Otis Frederick Reed. New Hampshire in the Great Rebellion: Containing Histories of the Several New Hampshire Regiments, and Biographical Notices of Many of the Prominent Actors in the Civil War of 1861-65 (1870). online

History of New Hampshire
New Hampshire in the American Civil War
American Civil War by state